The Zoo Gang is a 1974 ITC Entertainment drama series that ran for six one-hour colour episodes, based on the 1971 book of the same name by Paul Gallico.

Plot
Five French Resistance fighters, known by their animal-based code names (the Wolf, the Tiger, the Elephant, the Leopard and the Fox), fought during World War II. Their efforts came to a stop when one of their number, Claude Roget (the Wolf), was betrayed to the Gestapo by a contact called Boucher. In their interrogation of him, Roget—who was the husband of Manouche (the Leopard)--was shot dead before her eyes.

Twenty-eight years later, Thomas Devon (the Elephant) spots Boucher (going under the name of Rosch) in his shop. The surviving members of the Zoo Gang drop what they are doing and rendezvous for vengeance. The rest of the series follows the adventures of the remaining gang of four resistance fighters reunited decades later to scam habitual con artists and criminals in order to take their money and use it for good causes. Despite their ages, they put their skills and experience to use to raise enough money to construct a hospital in the memory of Claude. The gang is (reluctantly) aided by the son of Manouche and Claude, an inspector in the French police.

The series is set on the French Riviera in Nice. Guest stars included Philip Madoc, Peter Cushing and Jacqueline Pearce. Roger Delgado, best known for his role as Doctor Who villain The Master, also appeared, although he had died in a car crash prior to the series' broadcast.

Main cast

 Barry Morse as Alec Marlowe – The Tiger: Canadian, now working as a vehicle mechanic.
 Lilli Palmer as Manouche Roget – The Leopard: French, running a small cafe "Les Pecheurs" in Nice.
 Brian Keith as Steven Halliday – The Fox: American, now an antiques dealer.
 John Mills as Thomas Devon – The Elephant: British, running a jewellery shop in Nice, was given his nickname because of his excellent memory.
 Michael Petrovitch as Lieutenant Georges Roget (Roget's son)
 Serretta Wilson as Jill Burton (Devon's niece)

Music
The series theme music was composed by Paul and Linda McCartney. The score was composed by Ken Thorne. Both are available on the Network compilation The Music of ITC, Network 7959016.

Episode list
Airdates given here are for ATV, other ITV regions airdates vary.

International distribution
The series aired on CBC-TV in Canada in the summer of 1974. In the U.S., the series was broadcast by NBC, two episodes per night for three nights in July and August 1975.

Home media
The complete series was released on Region 2 DVD on 2 July 2007.  Actor Barry Morse (The Tiger), by then the last surviving regular actor from the series, provided an introduction in the DVD extras. He died the following year.

The complete series was released in high-definition on Blu-Ray disc by Network Distributing on 21 May 2018.

External links
 
 Action TV
 The Official Website of Barry Morse

1974 British television series debuts
1974 British television series endings
Television series by ITC Entertainment
ITV television dramas
Television series produced at Pinewood Studios
English-language television shows
1970s British drama television series
Adaptations of works by Paul Gallico